The 2021 Utah Utes football team represented the University of Utah during the 2021 NCAA Division I FBS football season. The Utes were led by 17th-year head coach Kyle Whittingham and played their home games at Rice–Eccles Stadium in Salt Lake City as members of the South Division of the Pac-12 Conference. Despite a rough start to the season and the death of players Ty Jordan and Aaron Lowe, the Utes rallied and won their first Pac-12 championship since joining the conference in 2011, defeating the tenth-ranked Oregon Ducks, 38–10, in the conference championship game. The Utes completed their season with their first ever appearance in the Rose Bowl, where they lost to Ohio State.

Schedule

Source:

Rankings

Personnel

Game summaries

No. 6 (FCS) Weber State

at BYU

at San Diego State

Washington State

at USC

No. 18 Arizona State

at Oregon State

UCLA

at Stanford

at Arizona

No. 3 Oregon

Colorado

vs. No. 10 Oregon (Pac-12 Championship Game)

vs. No. 6 Ohio State (Rose Bowl)

Awards and honors
 September 7, 2021 – Devin Lloyd, Pac-12 Conference Defensive Player of the Week

References

Utah
Utah Utes football seasons
Pac-12 Conference football champion seasons
Utah Football